Kahaani Hamaaray Mahaabhaarat Ki is an Indian mythological television drama series on 9X based on the Sanskrit epic Mahabharata.

It ran from 7 July 2008 to 6 November 2008. The series was produced by Ekta Kapoor and Shobha Kapoor under their banner Balaji Telefilms. It went off air on 6 November 2008.

Plot
It's a dynastic struggle for the throne of Hastinapur, the kingdom ruled by the Kuru clan. The two branches of the family that participate in the struggle are the Kauravas and the Pandavas. Although the Kauravas are the senior branch of the family, Duryodhan, the eldest Kaurava, is younger than Yudhishthira, the eldest Pandav. The seeds of the climactic battle of Kurukshetra were laid in the boyhood days of the Kauravas and Pandavas, when Shakuni, the maternal uncle of the Kauravas poisoned the mind of Duryodhana. This series ends before the Kurukshetra war actually occurs.

Cast

Main
 Mrunal Jain as Krishna
 Hiten Tejwani as Karna
 Ronit Roy as Bhishma
 Anita Hassanandani as Draupadi
 Uma Shanker as Yudhishtir
 Aryan Vaid as Duryodhan
 Chetan Hansraj as Bheem
 Ajaz Khan as Dushasan
 Harshad Chopda / Sid Makkar as Arjuna
 Deepak Sandhu as Nakul
 Jatin Shah as Sahadeva

Other Cast
  Puja Banerjee as Radha
  Kiran Karmarkar as Shantanu
  Sakshi Tanwar as Ganga
  Ravee Gupta as Satyavati
  Makrand Deshpande as Ved Vyas
  Rakshanda Khan as Amba
  Sonal Udeshi as Ambalika
  Vindhya Tiwari as Ambika
  Jaya Bhattacharya as Kunti
  Kali Prasad Mukherjee as Shakuni
  Deepak Jethi as Dronacharya
  Rituraj Singh as Kashi Naresh
  Akashdeep Saigal as Kans
 Krrish Karnavat as Krishna (child)
 Amar Sharma as Jarasandh
 Anurag Sharma as Shishupala
  Alpesh Patel as King Virata
  Gaurav Nanda as Gargacharaya
  Manoj Ramola as Shatrughna
  Gautam Gulati as Duryodhan (teenage)
 Vishal Thakkar as Bhishma (teenage)
  Lavanya Bhardwaj as Sahadeva (teenage)

Reception 
Writing for Livemint, Padmaparna Ghosh wrote that "KHMK suffers from a bad case of Kapoor soap hangover. Soft focus close-ups, shaky camera angles, repeat sequences — the new Mahabharat has it all.". Actor Mukesh Khanna stated that producer Ekta Kapoor made a horrendous epic saga which was incomprehensible with the characterisation and costumes of the mythological characters. He also stated that the way Kapoor made the saga was a mockery of Mahabharata.

Navya Sinha another critic wrote for Hindustan Times that "Six-pack abs, waxed chests, off-shoulder blouses and a scantily-clad Draupadi decked in a chiffon sari... that’s what Ekta Kapoor’s version of Mahabharata is all about."

References

External links

Balaji Telefilms television series
2008 Indian television series debuts
2008 Indian television series endings
9X (TV channel) original programming
Television shows based on poems
Television series based on Mahabharata